Thabo Chakaka Nyirenda (born 1982) is the Current Attorney General of the Republic of Malawi. Before assuming the Attorney General's office, he worked at Malawi's central bank, the Reserve Bank of Malawi (RBM) as Manager of Ethics and Compliance Division and as In-house Legal Counsel.

Education 
In 2001, Nyirenda joined the University of Malawi at Chancellor College where he was enrolled to study Bachelor of Arts in Humanities (BAH) Degree. One year after studying for BAH he crossed to the Faculty of Law at the same Chancellor College where he graduated with Bachelor of Laws Degree (LLB) (Hons) in 2006. In 2018, he went for Master of Laws Degree (LLM) in International Financial Law at University of Sussex in United Kingdom.

Career 
Nyirenda has worked as a Senior Legal Aid Advocate from 2006 to 2008 at Legal Aid Department. He then joined the Ministry of Justice and Constitutional Affairs  in August 2008 as a Senior State Advocate where he worked as government lawyer in both criminal and civil suits. He was employed at the Reserve Bank of Malawi as an in-house Legal Counsel from July 2010. On 27 August 2021, the President of the Republic of Malawi Lazarus Chakwera appointed Nyirenda as the Attorney General replacing Chikosa Silungwe who was fired on 21 July 2021.

References 

Living people
University of Malawi alumni
Attorneys-General of Malawi
Chakaka, Thabo
People from Rumphi District
Alumni of the University of Sussex